Ich, ich or ICH may refer to:

Places
 Ich, Semnan, a village in Semnan Province, Iran
 Ich, Zanjan, a village in Zanjan Province, Iran
 Ich, alternative name of Ij, Zanjan, a village in Zanjan Province, Iran

Medicine
 The ego (German: Ich), one of the psychic apparatus defined in Sigmund Freud's structural model of the psyche
 Infectious canine hepatitis, an acute liver infection in dogs
 Intracranial hemorrhage, bleeding within the skull
 Intracerebral hemorrhage, bleeding into brain tissues and/or brain vessicles
 International Council for Harmonisation of Technical Requirements for Pharmaceuticals for Human Use
 UCL Institute of Child Health, University College London, UK

Science and technology
 Ichthyophthirius multifiliis, often shortened to ich, a disease of freshwater fish
 Cryptocaryon or marine ich, a similar disease of marine fish
 Intangible cultural heritage, a concept in cultural anthropology

Technology
 I/O Controller Hub, an Intel Southbridge technology
 Intelligent Corruption Handling, a corruption-handling method used in eMule

Other
 Ich, a German pronoun meaning  I, also a Middle English form of  I
 Ich (album), a 2006 album by German rapper Sido
 Indian Coffee House, a restaurant chain in India
 Interagency Council on Homelessness, United States

See also 
 
 ICK (disambiguation)
 Itch (disambiguation)